Alessandro Favaro (born 18 July 1995) is an Italian football player.

Club career
He made his Serie C debut for Padova on 27 September 2017 in a game against FeralpiSalò.

References

External links
 

1995 births
People from the Province of Pordenone
Footballers from Friuli Venezia Giulia
Living people
Italian footballers
Udinese Calcio players
A.S.D. Sacilese Calcio players
Calcio Padova players
Serie C players
Serie D players
Association football goalkeepers